Small Planet Airlines is a former leisure airline based in Lithuania.

Small Planet Airlines may also refer to its also defunct sister and subsidiary companies:
Small Planet Airlines (Cambodia) 
Small Planet Airlines (Germany) 
Small Planet Airlines (Italy) 
Small Planet Airlines (Poland)